This is a list of listed buildings in Hjørring Municipality, Denmark.

The list

9480 Løkken

9760 Vrå

9800 Hjørring

9850 Hirtshalsl

9870 Sindal

9850 Hirtshalsl

References

External links

 Danish Agency of Culture

 
Hjørring